MU 90 may refer to:

MU90 Impact, a European antisubmarine torpedo
MU-90, a Czechoslovakia mine-laying variant of the Soviet BMP-1 infantry fighting vehicle